A nail, as a unit of cloth measurement, is generally a sixteenth of a yard or 2 inches (5.715 cm). The nail was apparently named after the practice of hammering brass nails into the counter at shops where cloth was sold. On the other hand, R D Connor, in The weights and measures of England (p 84) states that the nail was the 16th part of a Roman foot, i.e., digitus or finger, although he provides no reference to support this. Zupko's A dictionary of weights and measures for the British Isles (p 256) states that the nail was originally the distance from the thumbnail to the joint at the base of the thumb, or alternately, from the end of the middle finger to the second joint.

An archaic usage of the term nail is as a sixteenth of a (long) hundredweight for mass, or 1 clove of 7 pound avoirdupois (3.175 kg).

The nail in literature

Explanation: Katherine and Petruchio are purchasing new clothes for Bianca's wedding. Petruchio is concerned that Katharine's dress has too many frills, wonders what it will cost, and suspects that he has been cheated. Katherine says she likes it, and complains that Petruchio is making a fool of her. The tailor repeats Katherine's words: Sir, she says you're making a fool of her. Petruchio then launches into the above-quoted tirade. Monstrous may be a double-entendre for cuckold. The half-yard, quarter and nail were divisions of the yard used in cloth measurement.

The nail in law

Notes

Units of length
Units of area
Units of mass